Antonio Trentanove (c. 1745 – 1812) was an Italian sculptor and stucco-artist, active in Bologna in a Neoclassical style.

He was born in Rimini and studied at the Accademia Clementina. He is best known for his stucco decorations. He completed some stucco reliefs as part of a team led by Felice Giani for the Palazzo Laderchi in Faenza. Some of his other works are in the church of San Girolamo in Rimini, in the church of Santa Lucia in Forlì and the Palazzo Milzetti in Faenza. He later lived in Massa Marittima for some years and died in Carrara. His son, Raimondo, studied sculpture with Antonio Canova.

References

1745 births
1812 deaths
18th-century Italian sculptors
Italian male sculptors
19th-century Italian sculptors
People from Rimini
19th-century Italian male artists
18th-century Italian male artists